Laçın may refer to:
Lachin District, Azerbaijan
Lachin, capital of Lachin Rayon of Azerbaijan (de jure), capital of Qashatagh Province of Nagorno-Karabakh Republic(de facto).
Laçın, Kalbajar, a village in the Kalbajar Rayon of Azerbaijan (de jure), a village in the Shahumian Province of Nagorno-Karabakh Republic(de facto).

See also 
 Laçin a district center in Çorum Province, Turkey
 Laçin, a town in Eskişehir Province, Turkey